Sherdil Shergill is an Indian Hindi-language television romantic comedy drama series that aired on Colors TV from 26 September 2022 to 10 February 2023. It is digitally available on Voot. Produced by Saurabh Tewari under Parin Multimedia, it stars Dheeraj Dhoopar and Surbhi Chandna.

Plot
The story opens featuring Manmeet Shergill, a 30 year old woman, who has made a name and recognition in the male dominated field of architecture, despite facing troubles in the past from her family and the society. She is a single parent to her son, Anmol Shergill whom she had through IVF technique.Despite being at distances with her family, she is invited for her younger sister, Gunjan’s wedding ceremony. Her father however puts forward a condition that she can only come if she doesn’t bring Anmol. 

Unwillingly, Manmeet has assigned a trainee at her office, Rajkumar Yadav, who is playful and fun at all times. Manmeet soon realises that Raj is actually a stand-up comedian. Since knowing his secret, Manmeet requests him to become her (fake) husband just for the time of Gunjan’s marriage; to face no obstacles from society and the family. Helpless, and desperate to hide from his namesake girlfriend Nikki, Raj agrees to Manmeet’s plead. 

At Shimla, Raj manages to unite Manmeet with her father, who she has been at odds with for years. However, during the marriage ceremony, Bhairav and Nirali Yadav, the parents of Raj, arrive creating a tension. Confused, they question the same while Manmeet apologises and tells them that it was all an act. 

Nikki, who is furious at Raj, blackmails Raj with a suicide message. So this time, Raj requests Manmeet to pretend like his wife to convince Nikki! Manmeet and Raj manage to tell Nikki that they are in love. However, Nikki creates a scene and informs the Yadavs once again, causing chaos, as they call over the Shergill family to Mumbai to clear out the truth.

Cast

Main 
 Surbhi Chandna as Manmeet "Chitti" Shergill Yadav: Ajeet and Puneet's elder daughter; Gunjan's elder sister; Anmol's mother; Rajkumar's wife 
 Dheeraj Dhoopar as Rajkumar "Raj" Yadav: Bhairav and Nirali's son; Pankhudi's brother; Priyanka's twin brother; Manmeet's husband; Anmol's father

Recurring
 Iqbal Azad as Ajeet Shergill: Puneet's husband; Manmeet and Gunjan's father; Anmol's grandfather
 Anindita Chatterjee as Puneet Shergill: Ajeet's wife; Manmeet and Gunjan's mother; Anmol's grandmother
 Sneha Tomar as Gunjan Shergill: Ajeet and Puneet's younger daughter; Manmeet's younger sister; Anmol's aunt
 Sai Ballal as Bhairav Yadav: Nirali's husband; Pankhudi, Rajkumar and Priyanka's father; Anmol's  grandfather
 Kiran Deep Sharma as Nirali Yadav: Bhairav's wife; Pankhudi, Rajkumar and Priyanka’s mother; Anmol's  grandmother
 Bhoomika Mirchandani as Priyanka "Chhoti" Yadav: Bhairav and Nirali's daughter; Pankhudi's sister; Rajkumar’s twin sister; Anmol's  aunt
 Sunita Rawat Pai as Rajkumar's sister: Bhairav and Nirali's daughter; Priyanka and Pankhudi's sister; Anmol's aunt
 Preeti Singh as Pankhudi Yadav: Bhairav and Nirali's daughter; Rajkumar and Priyanka's sister; Murari's wife; Anmol's  aunt
 Masshe Uddin Qureshi as Murari: Pankhudi's husband
 Stavya as Anmol: Manmeet's son Rajkumar's stepson
 Ayesha Kapoor as Nikki: Rajkumar's former girlfriend 
 Srishti Mandal as Vidya: Manmeet's helper; Anmol's nanny
 Nitin Bhatia as Radhe
 Aarya Dharmchand Kumar as Hussain: Manmeet's partner in 'Soorti constructions'

Production

Casting 
In June 2022, Dheeraj Dhoopar was cast for the lead role of Rajkumar Yadav. Surbhi Chandna was signed as the female lead Manmeet Shergill.

Sneha Tomar was cast to play Manmeet's sister Gunjan in the series. Ayesha Kapoor was cast as Rajkumar's girlfriend Nikki.

Filming
The shooting of the series, began in June 2022. It is mainly shot at the Film City, Mumbai. Some initial sequences were shot in Shimla.

Release
Sherdil Shergill'''s promos were released in July 2022. It premiered on 26 September 2022 on Colors TV and on Voot.
Cancellation
The show went off-air within four months. The show bid adieu to viewers on February 10.

 Reception 
Sukarna Mondal of The Times of India'' stated, "Sherdil Shergill looks promising with two big names paired for the first time. Surbhi and Dheeraj’s pairing is quite refreshing. Also, Surbhi underplays Manmeet compared to how successful her character is established."

See also  
List of programmes broadcast by Colors TV

References

External links
 Sherdil Shergill on Colors TV
 
 Sherdil Shergill on Voot

2022 Indian television series debuts
Indian drama television series
Hindi-language television shows
Colors TV original programming